Gymnoscelis silvicola is a moth in the family Geometridae. It was described by András Mátyás Vojnits in 1994. It is found in the Afrotropical realm.

References

Moths described in 1994
silvicola